Wentworth is a coloured area of Durban, South Africa in the province of KwaZulu-Natal. It is located completely inside an area known as the South Durban Basin. The Wentworth area is located near major freeways M4 and M7 is approximately 11km south of the Durban City Centre.

History
Wentworth forms part of the South Durban Basin. Initiated in 1938 by British colonialists, the area's original purpose was to serve as an army base.  Due to the 1950 Group Areas Act Apartheid-era policy however, the region was split into districts depending on ethnic background. Today in fact, Wentworth is made up primarily of people who identify as "Coloured"—a term used in South Africa to distinguish someone of mixed ethnic background. The Group Areas Act was not unique to the South Durban Basin; it was a policy whose touch still can be seen in metropolitan and suburban areas all over the country today. The Bluff Nature Reserve on Tara Road divided (and for the most part continues to divide) Wentworth from the Bluff and thus the coloured population from the white one.

In the 1960s, Coloured people were relocated to the swampy unused land of Wentworth (also known as Austerville). The red brick buildings in this area, once occupied by white military families, were then converted into homes for the Coloured people.  Affluent Coloured families were also allowed to purchase prime real estate on Treasure Beach, which was originally set aside for Coloured development.  An area known as Happy Valley separates Treasure Beach from Tara Road and Wentworth. This bushland was the site of many informal settlements and tin shanties, but were soon demolished when the area's largest oil refineries, Engen and SAPREF moved in 1952 and 1963. These two refineries still prove to be both physical and economic landmarks in the area today.  Further down Tara Road and past Wentworth is an area known as Merebank: this is where Indians were relocated and where the population is still concentrated today. During this period of oppression, neither Coloured nor Indian people were allowed to move into the white regions.  All in all, while Wentworth is a place where the effects of Apartheid policies remain visible, it is also a place where many different cultures have managed to survive, blend, and flourish.

Culture and Activities
The primarily spoken languages in Wentworth and the surrounding areas are English, Zulu and Afrikaans. This rich mix of languages and cultures naturally leads to an equally interesting mix of cuisine.  Common street foods include samosas and "bunnies" (both have roots in the Indian community), and one cannot attend a function without running across a pot full of steaming biryani (a popular rice dish).  British tea culture often winds its way into Wentworth's cultural tapestry as well.

Another fixture in Wentworth culture is the use of "combis", or "share taxis".  While not unique to the African continent, not all areas of South Africa use this mode of transportation.  Whether independently owned or part of the many combi companies in the area, they can always be seen around Wentworth.  Combis in Wentworth are particularly interesting because of the elaborate way the drivers name and decorate their cars.

There are many local soccer, rugby, and cricket leagues that people of all ages engage in.  Because of Wentworth's proximity to the coast, the area is also ideal for fishing, spending time at the beach and recreational swimming.  During June and July in fact, one would be likely to spot thousands of sardines migrating along the coast.

Government and Infrastructure
Wentworth is part of the eThekwini Metropolitan Municipality and is served by its current councilor, Aubrey Snyman.  Currently the Wentworth area votes primarily for the Democratic Alliance (DA), the party that is in direct opposition with the African National Congress (ANC).

The South African Police Service also have a significant presence in the area with their offices and local cells located in Austerville Drive. It also operates a very successful and reputable Victim Friendly Centre for victims of Abuse; the Majesterial district has one of the major courts in the Durban South. However, there is insufficient data but there are many repeat offenders who present at the court time and time again in the area which is ridden with Crime, largely due to two significant factors, the fact that much of the area live below the poverty line and secondly due to the incredibly high prevalence of not only HIV/AIDS but of an equally high incidence of associated Drug and Alcohol abuse.

The only community-based Addiction Recovery Centre locally open to all in the South Durban Basis is that of Place of Grace which operates a full rehabilitation programme on an out-patient basis with an optional safe-house residence, situated at The Blue Roof Wellness Centre,(which is now a youth centre {2017} run by Zoë-Life ) and is run by Act of Grace 145. A local Public Benefit Organisation, which provides large, and significant donations of food and new clothes, shoes and educational toys on a weekly basis, into the area, on a weekly basis, based on Needs Analysis which are completed in full prior to a households acceptance in the charity programme. This service has been discontinued.

Wentworth Hospital is a district level government hospital located in Wentworth on the Bluff. It has within itself, closed its detoxification unit for addicts in an area where drug abuse has reached pandemic levels, even with hospital premises. However a matter of Good governance and the training and management of security and personnel within the Hospital, could eradicate such problems, allowing the Hospital to effectively re-open this much needed unit.

The South African Post Office is situated on Austerville Drive.

Violence and Crime
An unfortunate component to life in Wentworth is, or rather, was, the high rates of violence and crime in the area.  Most of the crime in the area would stem from either gang violence, drugs, or acts by locals to defend the area from unscrupulous outsiders.  
In the 1980s in particular, gang violence in Wentworth was supposedly so bad that "people were afraid to walk the streets at night...it was like a war zone" (ccs.ukzn.ac.za, A current major contributing factor is that sometimes outsiders move in, and along with them a culture of violence, negating the wonderful work being done by current Role-Players.

Fortunately, many NGOs and churches in Wentworth fought to end the cycle of crime.  Today, along with the Addiction Recovery Centre and Victim Friendly Centre, other notable forces of change include the national organization Brothers For Life and the Violence Free Zones.  The Violence Free Zones were launched in 2008 with the combined efforts of the Brothers For Life and the Prevention in Action (PIA) movement, with the goal of providing community-based action and support against gender-based violence.  These zones can be spotted easily because of the neon-colored houses and signs that mark their beginning and end.

After all consideration, Wentworth is fast becoming a safe zone and is low on the list of High-crime areas in KwaZulu-Natal. For example, the number of people murdered in 2015 was ten (10), well below the national average. (www.crimestatssa.com) This includes the deaths of people who lost their lives in the industrial area close by, and business robbery-related deaths.

Says one community member and author named Christopher Lee. 'I have family in Wentworth and have been living in other towns for well over twenty-eight years, visiting all the while. After moving back home I realize that, despite the negativity thrust upon the area, Wentworth is generally a healthy place to live in. I see children walking around safely, even at night. I am yet to be approached by any drug dealer, and, besides the occasional blow-up by bored teenage boys, I have never witnessed any Gang violence in the past decade. It's like there are two sides to the place; the negative viewpoint is seen through the eyes of jaded locals or outsiders, and the actual side that I have seen for the past years, and still see now. True the place has "bad areas." (most towns do). Yet even there; people, strangers, are generally safe.'

Economy and Environment
Currently, there are approximately 350 businesses in the Wentworth area, the major ones being the SAPREF and Engen oil refineries, and the Mondi and Sappi paper mills.  Other industries that make up the Wentworth area include landfills, and water treatment sites.  In Wentworth area specifically, factories can be found on the northern, eastern, and western sides.

Environmental justice and apartheid are closely related because of the Group Areas Act.  Blacks (African), Coloured and Indians were placed in environmentally and aesthetically less pleasing areas, which ultimately led to those communities being exposed to more environmental hazards.  In short, the Group Areas Act forced Coloured, Indian, and African peoples to move close to these centers of heavy industry, therefore resulting in "a historically tense relationship between residents, big businesses, and environmentalists" (www.durban.gov.za, "South Durban Basin") that still continues to this day.  Organizations like the South Durban Community Environmental Alliance (SDCEA) for example, fight to change policies surrounding both environmental and social issues, as in the Wentworth area in particular those issues are so connected. 
 
 Despite the fact that Wentworth is a relatively industrialized area, the current unemployment rate still falls somewhere around 40 percent.

Education
In South Africa, the curriculum for all public primary and secondary schools is standardized.  For primary and secondary schools, the curriculum includes, mathematics, natural science, social science, as well as English, Zulu, and Afrikaans language courses.  Primary school encompasses grades R (the equivalent of kindergarten) to grade 7, and secondary school includes grades 8 to "matric".  In Wentworth itself, there are many primary and secondary schools that children from both Wentworth and the surrounding areas attend.

Primary schools 
 Assegai Primary: Assegai Primary School was founded in 1961 with the motto “Prosperity, Peace, Progress". The classrooms that students sit in today, however, were not completed until about twenty years later. The school's facilities include a computer room, library and grounds with basketball and netball courts as well as a soccer field. The school begins with grade R and continues until grade 7, with four classes of about forty students per grade (excluding grade R, which has two classes). Each class has one teacher. However, the senior primary (grades 4 through 7) has recently adopted a successful program of specialization in which educators are assigned a subject and move from class to class to teach that particular discipline. Assegai's students come from many different areas including both the surrounding Wentworth community and the nearby township of Umlazi. They are taught three languages (English, Zulu, and Afrikaans) in addition to the basic subjects such as Mathematics, Arts and Culture, Geography, etc. Learners also have the option to participate in after-school activities such as soccer, baseball, and rugby.

Austerville Primary was founded in 1960. It was the first school for so called mixed races. The motto is "Progress through knowledge". From 1960 to 1978 the school was housed in the K2 building. In February 1978 the school moved into the building on Silvertree Road. Facilities at the school include a computer room, audio-visual room and a library. 

Other primary schools are: 
Collingwood Primary
Durban East Primary
Gardenia Primary
Wentworth Primary
Bluff Christian Academy

Secondary schools
Fairvale Secondary
Interfellowship School
Umbilo Secondary
Wentworth Secondary
Bluff Christian Academy

Public Libraries
Austerville Library is located on Austerville Drive next to the local community hall. With a full free-use, internet cafe, on the same site available to the public working weekdays and in the afternoon reserved for the use of the internet by scholars and students.

References 

Suburbs of Durban